Marlene Smith (born 1964, Birmingham) is a British artist and curator, and one of the founding members of BLK Art Group. She was director of The Public in West Bromwich. She is UK Research Manager for Black Artists and Modernism, a collaborative research project run by the University of the Arts London and Middlesex University.

Education 
Smith studied Art & Design at Bradford College (1983–87).

Exhibitions

Selected solo exhibitions 
 1983–84: The Pan-Afrikan Connection
 1985: The Thin Black Line, Institute of Contemporary Arts
 1986: Unrecorded Truths, The Elbow Room
 1986: Some of Us Are Brave, The Black-Art Gallery

References 

Living people
1964 births
British women artists